In American football, a spy is a defensive player assigned to cover an offensive backfield player man-to-man when they are expected to engage in a running play, but the offensive player does not run with the ball immediately.

This strategy is generally used with "dual-threat" quarterbacks who may be expected to run on their own after expected passing plays break down, with the defensive player floating near the line of scrimmage, following the quarterback's movements.

Spies are also sometimes known as "keys". Generally, spies are linebackers.

References

American football terminology